"East of the Sun and West of the Moon" is a Norwegian fairy tale.

East of the Sun and West of the Moon may also refer to:
"East of the Sun (and West of the Moon)", a song written by Brooks Bowman in 1935 that was later recorded by many jazz artists
East of the Sun, West of the Moon, a 1990 album by Norwegian band a-ha
East of the Sun, West of the Moon, a 1991 episode of the Rabbit Ears Productions children's television series We All Have Tales
East of the Sun and West of the Moon, a 2006 science fiction novel by John Ringo that is part of The Council Wars series
East of the Sun and West of the Moon, a 1926 expedition book by Theodore Roosevelt, Jr. and Kermit Roosevelt

See also
 East of the Sun (disambiguation)
 West of the Moon, a 2007 album by Tuatara
West of the Sun, a 1953 science fiction novel by Edgar Pangborn